Switzerland participated once in the Junior Eurovision Song Contest in . Radiotelevisione svizzera (RSI), a member organisation of the multilingual Swiss Broadcasting Corporation (SRG SSR) and the European Broadcasting Union (EBU), were responsible for the selection process of their participation. The only representative to participate for the nation was Demis Mirarchi with the song "", which finished in sixteenth place out of eighteen participating entries, achieving a score of four points. Switzerland did not compete in subsequent editions due to financial difficulties.

History
Italian-language broadcaster RTSI decided early on that due to budget issues, the winner of the 2002 local children's song contest  would represent the country at the Junior Eurovision Song Contest 2004. Although the EBU's rules at the time prohibited professional singers from entering, according to RTSI, the EBU had made an exception. Despite not being responsible for the country's entry, German and French-language broadcasters SRF and RTS relayed the contest with native language commentary.

The following year, due to financial difficulties, RTSI announced that they would be unable to participate in the contest without the participation of other broadcasters in Switzerland and the funding of the SRG SSR. RTSI reaffirmed this decision to press in 2016.

Participation overview

Commentators and spokespersons

The contests are broadcast online worldwide through the official Junior Eurovision Song Contest website junioreurovision.tv and YouTube. In 2015, the online broadcasts featured commentary in English by junioreurovision.tv editor Luke Fisher and 2011 Bulgarian Junior Eurovision Song Contest entrant Ivan Ivanov. The Swiss Broadcasting Corporation, SRG SSR, sent their own commentators to the contest in order to provide commentary in the French, German, and Italian languages. Spokespersons were also chosen by the national broadcaster in order to announce the awarding points from Switzerland. The table below list the details of each commentator and spokesperson since 2004.

See also
 Switzerland in the Eurovision Song Contest – Senior version of the Junior Eurovision Song Contest.
 Switzerland in the Eurovision Dance Contest – Dance version of the Eurovision Song Contest.
 Switzerland in the Eurovision Young Dancers – A competition organised by the EBU for younger dancers aged between 16 and 21.
 Switzerland in the Eurovision Young Musicians – A competition organised by the EBU for musicians aged 18 years and younger.

References

Countries in the Junior Eurovision Song Contest
Swiss music